Lumineux Noir is the third studio album of the Greek synthpop duo Marsheaux. It was released on 19 July 2009 by Undo Records. According to the Side-Line magazine, it did not "bring an evolution in sound, but shows a growing maturity in song writing and production". It is reminiscent of 1980s synthpop with tracks that have been compared to Ladytron, Chemical Brothers and Client.

Reception

Professional reviews compared the style to 1980s synthpop and contemporary acts. The Side-Line magazine wrote that Lumineux Noir showed "a growing maturity in song writing and production" and that the track "Sorrow" was reminiscent of And One. According to the Sonic Seducer, the album was approaching the style of Client and Ladytron while offering more different moods than Marsheaux's previous releases.

Track listing

Standard edition

Limited edition

This double disc was only produced with a limitation of 1,000 copies, and only available via the Out Of Line music label.

References

External links
 Official site
 Undo Records site

2009 albums
Marsheaux albums